Shahpur Assembly constituency is one of 243 legislative assembly seats of legislative assembly of Bihar. It is part of  Arrah lok sabha constituency along with other assembly constituencies viz Barhara, Arrah, Tarari, Jagdishpur, Sandesh and Agiaon (SC). 

In Madhya Pradesh Vidhan Sabha, there was a constituency by the same name, but the Shahpur Assembly constituency in Madhya Pradesh became defunct in 2008. Its serial number in the Election commission records is 198.

Area/ Wards
Shahpur Assembly constituency comprises:

 Shahpur CD block 
 Behea CD block

Members of the Legislative Assembly
The list of the Members of the Legislative Assembly (MLA) representing Shahpur constituency is as follows:

Election results

2020

References

External links
 

Politics of Bhojpur district, India
Assembly constituencies of Bihar